The Restoration (Spanish: La restauración) is a 2020 Peruvian comedy film written and directed by Alonso Llosa in his directorial debut. It stars Paul Vega, Atilia Boschetti, Delfina Paredes, Pietro Sibille and Muki Sabogal.

Synopsis 
The real estate boom is making a lot of people rich. But Tato, a charismatic and immature fifty-year-old, has lost everything. He has returned to live with his eccentric mother, Rosa, who humiliates him every chance she gets in the hope of keeping him inside her decrepit mansion. Desperate for financial independence, Tato sells the house without his mother's consent. To make her believe that she still lives inside her old room, Tato places her in a vaguely similar space, covered with plastic curtains to create the illusion that the house is being restored for its historical value. How long and at what price will Tato be able to maintain this impossible farce?

Cast 
The actors participating in this film are:

 Paul Vega as Tato Basile
 Muki Sabogal as Inez
 Attilia Boschetti as Rosa
 Delfina Paredes as Gloria
 Pietro Sibille as Raymond

Release 
In January 2020, the film premiered at the Santa Barbara International Film Festival (USA). The film premiered in August 2020 at the 24th Lima Film Festival. The film was later released commercially in theaters on October 6, 2022.

Awards

References

External links 

 

2020 films
2020 comedy films
Peruvian comedy films
2020s Peruvian films
2020s Spanish-language films
Films set in Peru
Films shot in Peru
Films about mother–son relationships
2020 directorial debut films